The Spelling Mistakes were a New Zealand punk band which had minor success in the local scene in 1979 and 1980.

History

Formed in 1979 from the remnants of two bands, Get Smart and The Aliens, their line-up was Nick Hanson (vocals), Julian Hanson (drums), and Warwick Fowler (guitar). Initial bassist, Keith Bacon, was replaced early in 1980 by Nigel Russell.

Their first recording was Reena, which featured on one side of a single (with The Whizz Kids) on Ripper Records in early 1980.

After winning a band talent quest, organised by their manager, they signed to Simon Grigg's Propeller Records label, and released a single, Feels So Good in June, 1980. This peaked at No. 29. A second single was recorded but remained unreleased for two decades as the band split in September 1980 after finding it increasingly difficult to find bookings because of the nature of their under-age following.

Legacy
They reformed briefly in 1999 but parted ways later that year. In 2004 Feels So Good was re-recorded and featured on an Export Gold advert.

A complete, semi-official, collection of available recordings was released in 2002 as a 2-disc set under the name The Spelling Mistakes: Epileptic Apocalypse 1979–1999. It was nominated for 'best rock release' by bNet NZ Music Awards in 2003.

Feels So Good was reissued on 7" single in June 2012 by New York label, Sing Sing Records.

Sources

External links
 NZ Musician Magazine album review
 newzealandcds.com album page
 music.net.nz album page
 Propeller Records

New Zealand punk rock groups